The 1922 Wimbledon Championships were the 42nd edition of the prestigious tennis tournament, held at the All England Lawn Tennis and Croquet Club in Wimbledon, London. The tournament ran from 26 June until 10 July. It was the 42nd staging of the Wimbledon Championships, and the first Grand Slam tennis event of 1922.

This edition of Wimbledon was historically important as being the first in which all defending champions were required to play in the main draw. Previously, the Gentlemen's Singles, Ladies' Singles, and Gentlemen's Doubles used a system known as the Challenge Round, in which the reigning champions were granted an automatic bye into the final while all other competitors played in a tournament to determine the final opponent.

It was also the first Championships played at the present site in Church Road.

Champions

Men's singles

 Gerald Patterson defeated  Randolph Lycett, 6–3, 6–4, 6–2

Women's singles

 Suzanne Lenglen defeated  Molla Mallory, 6–2, 6–0

Men's doubles

 James Anderson /  Randolph Lycett defeated  Gerald Patterson /  Pat O'Hara Wood, 3–6, 7–9, 6–4, 6–3, 11–9

Women's doubles

 Suzanne Lenglen /  Elizabeth Ryan defeated  Kitty McKane /  Margaret Stocks, 6–0, 6–4

Mixed doubles

 Pat O'Hara Wood /  Suzanne Lenglen defeated   Randolph Lycett /  Elizabeth Ryan, 6–4, 6–3

References

External links
 Official Wimbledon Championships website

 
Wimbledon Championships
Wimbledon Championships
Wimbledon Championships
Wimbledon Championships